Christopher (Chris) Tavarez (born November 7, 1992, Atlanta, Georgia) is an American actor, model, and athlete. After modeling as a young child, his parents were encouraged by scouts to pursue the world of acting for their son. 
 His first television appearance was on the Discovery Kids reality show, Endurance. He appeared on the 4th season when he was 12 (making him the youngest contestant on the show) in the show, he made himself seem like a huge threat, which other contestants took seriously, although he was eliminated after the first elimination. Chris's talent was quickly recognized by talent agent, Joy Pervis, who also discovered child stars Dakota Fanning, Kyle Massey, and Lucas Till. He stayed busy working in the Atlanta market booking commercials, print, television, and films. Chris has been cast in several movies, including Big Momma's House 2, and he has a recurring role on Tyler Perry's television series, Meet the Browns. Chris's big break came when he was cast for the lead role of Lance in the Disney Channel original movie, Avalon High.

Chris was the safety and captain of his football team at Westlake High School in Atlanta, Georgia. He has been scouted and has more than seven NCAA Division I scholarships to colleges such as Duke, Tulane, Maryland, and Vanderbilt. In August 2010, Tavarez committed to play football for Duke University.

In 2020, Tavarez was sentenced to 300 days in county jail following domestic violence charges.

References

External links 
 
 
 

1992 births
American male actors
Living people
American people of Costa Rican descent